Karawaci is a district of Tangerang City, Banten, Indonesia. It has an area of 13.475 km² and a population of 184,388 at the 2020 Census. Lippo Karawaci, a planned community, is located here.

This district formed part of the particuliere landerij, or private domain, of the Oey family of Karawatji, part of the 'Cabang Atas' landowning gentry of colonial Java. Oey Djie San, head of the family at the turn of the century, served as Kapitein der Chinezen of Tangerang.

The district is subdivided into 16 administrative villages (kelurahan).

Notable companies
Lippo Karawaci

References

Tangerang
Districts of Banten